Steelbound is a full-length studio album by German heavy metal band Paragon, released in 2001.

Track listing
 "Thunderstorm" - 03:54
 "Steelbound" - 04:16
 "Deathsquad" - 04:14
 "New Dark Age" - 05:58
 "Don't Wake the Dead" - 05:50
 "Reign of Fear" - 04:20
 "Burning Bridges" - 05:25
 "Tears of the Damned" - 05:39
 "Face II Face" - 03:54
 "Immortal" - 04:51
 "World of Sin" - 04:17

Credits 

 Andreas Babuschkin - Lead Vocals
 Martin Christian - Guitars / Backing Vocals 
 Claudius Cremer - Guitars 
 Jan Bünning - Bass / Backing Vocals 
 Markus Corby - Drums

All music written & composed by: Christian/Bünning/Corby, except:
"Don't Wake The Dead" by: Christian/Bünning/Cremer
"Immortal" by: Christian/Cremer
"World Of Sin" by: Christian

All lyrics by: Babuschkin, except:
"Steelbound" by: Babuschkin/Bünning
"New Dark Age" by: Christian
"World Of Sin" by: Karsten

2001 albums
Paragon (band) albums